Aframomum sericeum is a species of plant in the ginger family, Zingiberaceae. It was first described by Jean-Baptiste Dhetchuvi and David J. Harris.

Range
Aframomum sericeum is native to Gabon, Cameroon, The Democratic Republic of the Congo, the Central African Republic, and Equatorial Guinea.

References 

sericeum